The 1998–99 season was the 47th season in the history of CD Ourense and their third consecutive season in the second division. The club participated in the Segunda División and the Copa del Rey. The season covered the period from 1 July 1998 to 30 June 1999.

Competitions

Overall record

League table

Results summary

Results by round

Matches

Copa del Rey

First round

Second round

References 

CD Ourense
Ourense